Andrew Baxter (March 1869 – April15, 1955), African-American fiddle player, and Jim Baxter (James Baxter; January18, 1898 – June11, 1950), African-American-Cherokee singer and guitar player, were a father and son fiddle and guitar duet from Gordon County, Georgia, who recorded in the 1920s.

The Georgia Yellow Hammers and the Baxters traveled to Charlotte, North Carolina, to record for Victor in the summer of 1927. Because of the Jim Crow laws, the Baxters had to ride several cars behind the Yellow Hammers on the train ride to Charlotte. In Charlotte, each group recorded their individual sessions, with one exception: Andrew Baxter played fiddle on "G Rag" with the Yellow Hammers. It is thought that "G Rag" is one of the earliest integrated recordings of Georgia musicians.

Among their recordings is "40 Drops", a tribute to Georgia corn moonshine, an instrumental with vocal comments - a style typical of instrumental recordings of the 1920s.

In May 2012, their recording of "K.C. Railroad Blues" was released on the compilation album, Lonesome Whistle: An Anthology of American Railroad Songs.

References

Bibliography
Wayne W. Daniel, Pickin' on Peachtree: A History of Country Music in Atlanta, Georgia (Urbana: University of Illinois Press, 1990), p. 76-77.
The Encyclopedia of Country Music, ed. Paul Kingsbury (New York: Oxford University Press, 1998), s.v. "Georgia Yellow Hammers."
Gene Wiggins and Tony Russell, "Hell Broke Loose in Gordon County, Georgia," Old Time Music 25 (Summer 1977): p. 9-21.
Charles K. Wolfe, "The Georgia Yellow Hammers," in Classic Country: Legends of Country Music (New York: Routledge, 2001).
Tony Russell, Old Time Music Journal.
Gene Wiggins, Old Time Music Journal.

External links
Illustrated Andrew & Jim Baxter discography

Baxter, Andrew and Jim
People from Gordon County, Georgia
Country musicians from Georgia (U.S. state)